Monsignor Brian Egan OSB (18 July 1925 - 25 January 2011) was an Irish-American priest, monsignor, theologian, educator and first President of Southern Benedictine College. He was a "celebrity priest", and was friends with the Kennedys, particularly Robert and Ethel, as well as the comedian Bob Hope. He was also first cousin of the Irish Redemptorist priest Fr Patrick Egan.

References

1925 births
2011 deaths
American priests
20th-century American theologians
21st-century American theologians
Educators from Philadelphia